Pete Stewart (born August 12, 1931 in Statesville, North Carolina) is a retired NASCAR Grand National Series driver who participated in 17 racing events from 1953 to 1965.

Career
While never winning a race, Stewart managed to complete  of demanding pavement and dirt track racing. On average, Stewart started in 26th place and ended in 23rd place. His modest racing career left him with only a total career earnings of $3,940 ($ when adjusted for inflation).

Stewart would see his best finishes on dirt tracks; where he would finish an average of 19th place. However, Pete Stewart's Achilles heel came on tri-oval intermediate tracks where a meager 28th place would have been considered par for the course.

The primary vehicle for Pete Stewart would have been the #53 Ford owned by David Warren. Warren also participated in the NASCAR Convertible Series and the NASCAR Modified series in a select number of races.

References

1931 births
2013 deaths
NASCAR drivers
People from Statesville, North Carolina
Racing drivers from North Carolina